The women's 100 metres T13 event at the 2016 Summer Paralympics took place at the Rio Olympic Stadium on 10 and 11 September. It featured 15 athletes from 11 countries.

The T13 category is for athletes with a moderate visual impairment. Athletes in this category have a variety of visual impairments, but typically can recognise contours from a distance of 2 to 6 metres. Athletes in this category do not typically require a guide.

Heats 

The heats were completed at 12:02 and 12:09 local time. Heat 1 (-1.1 m/s); Heat 2 (-1.0 m/s)

Heat 1

Heat 2

Final

References 

Women's